Attera Orbis Terrarum – Part II is the second of the two-part Attera Orbis Terrarum series of live DVDs by Swedish black metal band Dark Funeral. This part accounts for the South American leg of the Attera Orbis Terrarum tour in October 2006, and also includes amateur footage filmed in both North America and South America.

Track listing

Disc One

Live in Argentina, October 2006
"Intro" – 1:29
"King Antichrist" – 4:20
"Diabolis Interium" – 4:14
"Ravenna Strigoi Mortii" – 4:16
"The Arrival of Satan's Empire" – 3:47
"Open the Gates" – 4:10
"Vobiscum Satanas" – 4:56
"666 Voices Inside" – 4:36
"The Secrets of the Black Arts" – 3:58
"Attera Totus Sanctus" – 5:23
"Hail Murder" – 5:57
"Atrum Regina" – 6:01
"My Dark Desires" – 4:20
"An Apprentice of Satan" – 7:50

Amateur footage
"The Dawn No More Rises" (Live in Chicago, IL, 1997) – 4:09
"Satan's Mayhem" (Live in Manhattan, NY, 1997) – 5:12
"The Secrets of the Black Arts" (Live in Westland, MI, 1999) – 4:12
"Shadows over Transylvania" (Live in San Bernardino, CA, 2000) – 3:36
"Bloodfrozen" (Live in New York City, NY, 2000) – 4:02
"An Apprentice of Satan" (Live in Hollywood, CA, 2004) – 5:32
"King Antichrist" (Live in Los Angeles, CA, 2007) – 5:12
"Diabolis Interium" (Live in Montreal, Canada, 2007) – 4:25

Disc Two

Live in Brazil, October 2006
"King Antichrist" – 7:21
"Diabolis Interium" – 4:27
"Ravenna Strigoi Mortii" – 3:57
"The Arrival of Satan's Empire" – 3:41
"Open the Gates" – 4:01
"Vobiscum Satanas" – 4:09
"666 Voices Inside" – 4:13
"Attera Totus Sanctus" – 5:36
"The Secrets of the Black Arts" – 3:18
"Godhate" – 4:51
"Hail Murder" – 5:13
"Atrum Regina" – 4:48
"My Dark Desires" – 4:05
"An Apprentice of Satan" – 7:19

Amateur footage
"My Dark Desires" (Live in Porto Alegre) – 4:23
"The Arrival of Satan's Empire" (Live in Santiago) – 5:45
"Vobiscum Satanas" (Live in Guatemala) – 5:05
"Open the Gates" (Live in Mexico City) – 5:42
"Godhate" (Live in Campinas) – 4:36

Personnel
Lord Ahriman – guitars
Emperor Magus Caligula – vocals
Chaq Mol – guitars
B-Force – bass
Matte Modin – drums (2000–2007)

External links
Dark Funeral discography

Dark Funeral video albums
2008 video albums
Live video albums
2008 live albums
Regain Records live albums
Regain Records video albums